Wensley Christoph (born 9 December 1984 in Paramaribo) is a Surinamese football player. He is capped for Suriname's national team. Christoph has played for Suriname in qualifying matches for the 2006 and 2010 World Cups. In the 2010 qualifying campaign, he was Suriname's top goalscorer with five goals. He currently plays club football for SV Notch in the SVB Topklasse in Suriname and leads now in the football season 2017 the topscorerslist with 7 goals.

External links
 

1984 births
Living people
Association football forwards
Sportspeople from Paramaribo
Surinamese footballers
Suriname international footballers
SVB Eerste Divisie players
S.V. Excelsior players